Barry Rice may refer to:

 Barry Rice (botanist), carnivorous plant grower and the author of the book Growing Carnivorous Plants
 Barry Rice (soccer) (born 1987), American soccer player